Ilčo Borov (born 25 July 1966) is a Macedonian retired football striker.

International career 
He made his senior debut for Macedonia in a May 1994 friendly match against Albania in Tetovo and has earned a total of 5 caps, scoring no goals. His final international was a June 1996 FIFA World Cup qualification match away against Iceland.

References

External links
 

1966 births
Living people
Association football forwards
Yugoslav footballers
Macedonian footballers
North Macedonia international footballers
FK Sileks players
FK Pobeda players
KF Apolonia Fier players
FK Borec players
Macedonian First Football League players
Kategoria Superiore players
Macedonian Second Football League players
Macedonian expatriate footballers
Expatriate footballers in Albania
Macedonian expatriate sportspeople in Albania